The white steenbras (Lithognathus lithognathus) is a species of fish in the family Sparidae endemic to South Africa. Due to overfishing, primarily by seine netting operations in False Bay, the white steenbras is now endangered and is about to become a 'no keep' species in South Africa. Massive breeding shoals are illegally wiped out by beach seine netters each year, with the authorities doing little to prevent this. The species was identified as a priority for research, management and conservation in a National Linefish Status Report.

References

White steenbras
Marine fish of South Africa
Endemic fish of South Africa
white steenbras
white steenbras